The East Palestine City School District is a public school district serving East Palestine and parts of surrounding Middleton and Unity townships in northeastern Columbiana County in Ohio, in the United States. It also includes Negley and a small portion of Columbiana.

Schools
East Palestine High School
East Palestine Middle School
East Palestine Elementary School

Former schools
Captain Taggart School - Closed in 1997, currently a nursing home
Negley School - currently Schoolhouse Square Community Center
Unity School - currently Maxwell China, Inc.
East North Avenue School - Closed in 1997, currently a private residence

References

External links

Education in Columbiana County, Ohio
School districts in Ohio
Public schools in Ohio